Kārikkannanār, known in full as Kāviripoompattinathu Kārikkannanār (Tamil: காவிரிப்பூம்பட்டினத்துக் காரிக்கண்ணனார்), was a poet of the Sangam period, to whom 10 verses of the Sangam literature have been attributed, including verse 28 of the Tiruvalluva Maalai.

Biography
Hailing from Kaveri Poompattinam (present-day Puhar), Kaari Kannanar was a trader by occupation and has sung in praise of kings Chola Kura Palli Thunjiya Perunthirumavalavan, Pandiyan Ilavanthigai Palli Thunjiya Nanmaran, Pandiyan Velliyambalatthu Thunjiya Peruvaludhi, Aai Aandiran, and Pittan Kottran. He compared the Chola and Pandiya rulers with Lord Vishnu and Balarama. His time was close to that of Uraiyur Marutthuvan Dhamodharanar, Kovoor Kilar, Maadalan Madurai Kumaranar, Aavoor Moolam Kilar, Nakkirar I, and Marudhanila Naganar.

Contribution to the Sangam literature
Kaari Kannanar has written 10 Sangam verses, including 5 in Purananuru (verses 57, 58, 169, 171, and 353), 1 in Kurunthogai (verse 297), 3 in Agananuru (verses 107, 123, and 285), and 1 in Tiruvalluva Maalai (verse 28).

Views on Valluvar and the Kural
Kaari Kannanar opines about Valluvar and the Kural text thus:

See also

 Sangam literature
 List of Sangam poets
 Tiruvalluva Maalai

Notes

References

 

Tamil philosophy
Tamil poets
Sangam poets
Tiruvalluva Maalai contributors